DJ Luck & MC Neat are a British musical duo, composed of Joel Samuels (a.k.a. DJ Luck) and Michael Rose (a.k.a. MC Neat) mainly performing a combination of house music and UK garage. They had three consecutive top 10 hits in the United Kingdom from 1999 to 2000.

Career
They are primarily known for their 1999 single, "A Little Bit of Luck", which started as a promotional dubplate, released at the price of £5. The track peaked at #9 in the United Kingdom in January 2000. That same year, they released a cover of "Master Blaster (Jammin)" by Stevie Wonder, retitled "Masterblaster 2000", which featured the vocals of JJ, who is on a number of Luck & Neat's songs. The track was their highest British chart entry, reaching #5 in June 2000. Their version of Ollie & Jerry's "Breakin'... There's No Stopping Us", retitled as "Ain't No Stoppin' Us", reached #8 in October that year. The duo also made an appearance on Top of the Pops performing their UK #12 track, "Piano Loco".

After the initial three chart hits they enjoyed, the majority of their work, along with their debut album, was produced along with, or by, the underground musician Shy Cookie, who was responsible for the shift in their music from sample based to programmed (original) and live instruments, helping them to maintain underground credibility that in turn helped fuel their mainstream success.

By 2002, they were billed more simply as Luck & Neat.

Discography

Albums
A Little Bit of Luck (2001)
It's All Good (2002) - UK #34
Kiss Garage Presented By DJ Luck & MC Neat (2000)
DJ Luck & MC Neat Presents... (2000)
DJ Luck & MC Neat Present... II (2001)
DJ Luck & MC Neat Present... III (2001)

Singles

References

UK garage duos
English electronic music duos
English dance music groups
Male musical duos
Musical groups established in 1999
Musical groups from London
1999 establishments in England